Hamlin Collegiate High School is a public high school located in Hamlin, Texas, United States and is part of the Hamlin Collegiate ISD located in far northwest Jones County. Partnering with Collegiate Edu-Nation in early 2019, Hamlin CISD was transformed into a collegiate district where students can receive industry certifications, associate's degrees, and innovative bachelor’s degrees all from Hamlin, at no cost to the students.

Athletics
The Hamlin Pied Pipers compete in cross-country, football, basketball, golf, track, softball, and baseball.

State titles
Girls' cross-country: 2012 (1A)
Boys' track: 1973 (2A), 1974 (2A)
Girls' track: 1980 (1A), 1985 (2A), 1986 (2A), 2005 (1A)

State finalist
Football: 2019 (2A/D2)

References

External links
Hamlin ISD

Public high schools in Texas
Schools in Jones County, Texas